Omanakkunju is a 1975 Indian Malayalam-language film,  directed by A. B. Raj and produced by K. P. Kottarakkara. The film stars Madhu, Sheela, Adoor Bhasi and Jose Prakash in the lead roles. The film has musical score by M. K. Arjunan. The film was a remake of the Tamil film Kuzhanthaikkaga, which itself was a remake of the Telugu film Papa Kosam.

Cast

Madhu
Sheela
Adoor Bhasi
Jose Prakash
Paul Vengola
Sukumaran
Baby Babitha
Janardanan
Jayamalini
Mallika Sukumaran
N. Govindankutty
Sudheer
Vanchiyoor Radha

Soundtrack
The music was composed by M. K. Arjunan with lyrics by Sreekumaran Thampi.

References

External links
 

1975 films
1970s Malayalam-language films
Malayalam remakes of Tamil films
Films directed by A. B. Raj